Turbonilla escondida is a species of sea snail, a marine gastropod mollusk in the family Pyramidellidae.

Original description
      Poppe G.T., Tagaro S.P. & Stahlschmidt P. (2015). New shelled molluscan species from the central Philippines I. Visaya. 4(3): 15-59.
page(s): 31, pl. 11 figs 4-5.

References

External links
 Worms Link

escondida